Frances Gwendoline Lycett (19 September 1880 – 6 May 1954) was a British figure skater. She competed at the 1908 Summer Olympics, the first Olympics where figure skating was contested, and finished fifth out of five skaters.  She also participated at the World Figure Skating Championships twice, finishing fourth in 1912.

Competitive highlights

References

External links
 
 Skatabase
 Sports-Reference page

Figure skaters at the 1908 Summer Olympics
Olympic figure skaters of Great Britain
British female single skaters
1880 births
1954 deaths